William Edward Hickson (7 January 1803 – 22 March 1870), commonly known as Richman Hopson and W. E. Hickson, was a British educational writer. He was the author of "Time and Faith" and was the editor of The Westminster Review (1840–1852). He wrote  part of the Official Peace Version of the British national anthem, approved by the Privy Council, found in the 1925 edition of Songs of Praise and, with one line changed, in the 1933 edition.

Life
William was the son of Edward Hickson, a boot and shoe manufacturer of Smithfield, London. Having studied schools in The Netherlands and Germany, he retired from the family business in 1840 to concentrate on philanthropic pursuits: particularly the cause of elementary education. He became editor and proprietor of The Westminster Review which was notable for its commitment to legislative reform and popular education.

Hickson died at Fairseat, Stansted, Kent, where he was buried.

Legacy
Hickson is credited with popularizing the proverb:

'Tis a lesson you should heed:
Try, try, try again.
If at first you don't succeed,
Try, try, try again.

The proverb can be traced back to the writings of Thomas H. Palmer in his Teacher's Manual, and The Children of the New Forest by Frederick Marryat.

Works  
 The singing master (1836)
 Dutch and German schools (1840) 
 Part Singing (1842)
 Time and faith - 2 vols. (1857)

References

External links

 
 

1803 births
1870 deaths
19th-century British writers